The Minister for Institutional Reforms (Italian: Ministro per le Riforme Istituzionali) is one of the positions in the Italian government.

The current minister is Elisabetta Casellati, a member of the Forza Italia, who held the office since 22 October 2022 in the cabinet of Giorgia Meloni.

List of Ministers
Parties
 

 

Coalitions

References

Institutional Reforms